Venezuelan Popular Unity (Unidad Popular Venezolana) is a left-wing political party in Venezuela. It supported president Hugo Chávez and currently supports his successor Nicolás Maduro. It won one seat in the National Assembly in the 2005 Venezuelan parliamentary election. It merged into the United Socialist Party of Venezuela in 2007 but then was reinstated as a party in 2008.

References 

2005 establishments in Venezuela
2007 disestablishments in Venezuela
2008 establishments in Venezuela
Bolivarian Revolution
Communist parties in Venezuela
Defunct political parties in Venezuela
Political parties disestablished in 2007
Political parties established in 2005
Political parties established in 2008
Political parties in Venezuela